William Russo may refer to:

William Daddano Sr. (1912–1975), also known as William Russo, American mobster
William Russo (musician) (1928–2003), American jazz musician
Bill Russo (American football), head college football coach
Jigsaw (Marvel Comics), a villain from Marvel Comics, born William "Billy" Russo